The 2018–19 Northeast Conference men's basketball season began with practices in October 2018, followed by the start of the 2018–19 NCAA Division I men's basketball season in November. Conference play started in January and concluded in March 2019.

The NEC tournament was held from March 3 through March 9 with the higher-seeded team hosting each game.

Head coaches

Coaching changes 
On April 2, 2018, Bryant announced Jared Grasso as the 8th head coach in program history. Grasso replaced Tim O'Shea, who retired after last season.

On May 10, 2018, Mount St. Mary's announced Dan Engelstad as the 22nd head coach in program history. Engelstad replaced Jamion Christian, who went on to become the head coach at Siena.

Coaches 

Notes: 
 All records, appearances, titles, etc. are from time with current school only. 
 Year at school includes 2018–19 season.
 Overall and NEC/NCAA records are from time at current school and are before the beginning of the 2018–19 season.
 Previous jobs are head coaching jobs unless otherwise noted.

Preseason

Preseason coaches poll
Source

() first place votes

Preseason All-NEC team
Source

NEC regular season

Conference matrix
This table summarizes the head-to-head results between teams in conference play. (x) indicates games remaining this season.

Player of the week
Throughout the regular season, the Northeast Conference offices named player(s) of the week and rookie(s) of the week.

Postseason

NEC tournament
Teams are reseeded after each round with highest remaining seeds receiving home court advantage.

NCAA tournament

National Invitational Tournament

CollegeInsider.com Postseason Tournament

All-NEC honors and awards
Following the regular season, the conference selected outstanding performers based on a poll of league coaches.

See also
 2018–19 Northeast Conference women's basketball season

References

External links
NEC website